Renan Santos Soares (born 11 April 1989) is a Brazilian football midfielder. He played on the Portuguese second tier for Oliveirense.

References

1989 births
Living people
Brazilian footballers
Clube Atlético Colatinense players
Lagarto Futebol Clube players
U.D. Oliveirense players
G.D. Gafanha players
C.D. Fátima players
Lusitano FCV players
Association football midfielders
Liga Portugal 2 players
Brazilian expatriate footballers
Expatriate footballers in Portugal
Brazilian expatriate sportspeople in Portugal